Perry–Shepherd Farm, also known as the Swansie Shepherd Farm, is a historic home and farm complex located near Lansing, Ashe County, North Carolina.  The complex includes the main dwelling, a caretaker's cottage, a barn, a warehouse, a granary, and three sheds surrounded by woodland, open pasture, and blueberry and apple orchards.  The main house was built about 1890, and is a two-story, single-pile I-house with an original rear wing.  It has a double-porch and Queen Anne style decorative elements.

It was listed on the National Register of Historic Places in 2006.

References

Houses on the National Register of Historic Places in North Carolina
Farms on the National Register of Historic Places in North Carolina
Queen Anne architecture in North Carolina
Houses completed in 1890
Houses in Ashe County, North Carolina
National Register of Historic Places in Ashe County, North Carolina